Darrell Samson  (born October 13, 1958) is a Canadian politician who has served as the member of Parliament (MP) for Sackville—Preston—Chezzetcook since 2015. He is a former superintendent of the Conseil scolaire acadien provincial, Nova Scotia's Acadian and Francophone school board.

Early life and education
An Acadian, Samson is a native of Petit-de-Grat, Isle Madame, Nova Scotia. He attended the Université de Moncton, graduating in 1982 with a Bachelor of Education and in 1984 with a Masters in Education.

Before politics
Samson was a teacher/administrator at Caudle Park Elementary for many years before assuming his role at Conseil scolaire acadien provincial. He has been the national president and vice-president of all French school board superintendents outside Quebec, an active member of the National Committee for Early Years as well as a member of the Provincial Advisory Council to the Minister of Education on Early Years in Nova Scotia.

Political career 
Samson was elected to the House of Commons in the 2015 federal election to represent Sackville—Preston—Chezzetcook. In December 2019, he was named the parliamentary secretary to the minister of veterans affairs and associate minister of national defence.

Electoral record

References

External links

Living people
Members of the House of Commons of Canada from Nova Scotia
Liberal Party of Canada MPs
Acadian people
Université de Moncton alumni
Canadian school superintendents
21st-century Canadian politicians
1959 births
20th-century Canadian educators
People from the Halifax Regional Municipality